Budaka may refer to:
Budaka District, Uganda
Budaka County,  a county in Budaka District
Budaka, Uganda, a town and headquarters of the district